KFBK may refer to:

 KFBK (AM), a radio station (1530 AM) licensed to serve Sacramento, California, United States
 KFBK-FM, a radio station (93.1) licensed to serve Pollack Pines, California, United States